I'solezwe lesiXhosa is a Xhosa language newspaper launched in 2015.

History
I'solezwe lesiXhosa became the country's only  Xhosa newspaper when it was published on 30 March 2015, with the newspaper starting as a daily. It is now published weekly every Thursday and distributed in the Western Cape and Eastern Cape, predominantly Mthatha, East London, King William's Town and Port Elizabeth.

Distribution figures

See also
 List of newspapers in South Africa

References

Mass media in Durban
Weekly newspapers published in South Africa
Publications established in 2015
Xhosa-language mass media
2015 establishments in South Africa